Anaiwan (Anēwan) is an extinct Australian Aboriginal language of New South Wales. Since 2017, there has been a revival program underway to bring the language back.

Classification 
Once included in the Kuric languages, Bowern (2011) classifies Nganyaywana as a separate Anēwan (Anaiwan) branch of the Pama–Nyungan languages.

Dialects
Besides Nganyaywana, Anewan may include Enneewin, with which shares about 65% of its vocabulary. Crowley (1976) counts these as distinct languages, whereas Wafer and Lissarrague (2008) consider them to be dialects.

See also
Dyangadi languages

References

External links 
 Bibliography of Nganyaywana language and people resources, at the Australian Institute of Aboriginal and Torres Strait Islander Studies

Extinct languages of New South Wales
Central New South Wales languages